Robert Cordner (born February 1, 1932) is a Canadian sprint canoer who competed in the early 1950s. At the 1952 Summer Olympics in Helsinki, he was eliminated in the heats of the K-2 1000 m event.

References
Sports-reference.com profile

External links

1932 births
Canadian male canoeists
Canoeists at the 1952 Summer Olympics
Living people
Olympic canoeists of Canada
Place of birth missing (living people)